Francisco Pérez (born 1 July 1976) is a Mexican diver. He competed in the men's 10 metre platform event at the 2000 Summer Olympics.

References

1976 births
Living people
Mexican male divers
Olympic divers of Mexico
Divers at the 2000 Summer Olympics
Place of birth missing (living people)